John Oxenbridge LL.D. (died 25 July 1522) was a Canon of Windsor from 1509 to 1522.

Family

He was the son of Robert Oxenbridge and Anne Lyvelode.

Career

He was educated at the University of Valencia and graduated LL.B. in 1498 and LL.D by 1499.

He was appointed:
Prebendary of Hampstead in Chichester Cathedral 1499
Commissary and Sequestrator-General for the Bishop of Chichester in the Archdeaconry of Lewes 1498
Vicar of Icklesham (resigned 1505)
Vicar of Cullompton, Devon until 1522
Vicar of Shillington, Bedfordshire 1505
King's Clerk
 
He was appointed to the twelfth stall in St George's Chapel, Windsor Castle in 1509, and held the stall until 1522. A chantry was built in the chapel in his memory under the fifth arch in the south aisle of the choir. Over the door is a lion rampant, with escalope round him, with the rebus of the founder's name; an Ox, the letter N and a bridge.

Notes 

1522 deaths
Canons of Windsor
University of Valencia alumni
Year of birth missing